Beit Nekofa is a moshav in the Jerusalem District of Israel.

Etymology

Beit Nekofa's name may be based on the name of an ancient town, Nukveta of Benjamin, mentioned in the Talmud, from which the ancestors of Rabbi Judah haNasi are said to have come from. Nukveta is from the Hebrew word , Nikba, or tunnel.

According to Zev Vilnay, Beit Nekofa was mentioned in the Jerusalem Talmud as the place of residence of a family of Kohanim. The Hebrew root of the name is Nakaf (taken from Isaiah 17:6), referring to the collection of olives by means of hitting the tree, as opposed to harvest by hand (the Hebrew root Masak).

In Arabic, Naqb means (mountain) passage. An Arab village, Bayt Naqquba, existed in the same location until the 1948 Arab–Israeli War when the area came under Israeli control and the villagers were expelled. After the end of the war, the residents were not allowed to return to their village, but they were allowed later, in 1962, to establish a new village, Ein Naqquba, on the opposite side of Highway 1.

History

Beit Nekofa was founded in August 1949 by seven families who immigrated to Israel from Yugoslavia. The Neveh Ilan-Beit Nekofa area was devastated by fire in the summer of 1996. Two thousand dunams of forest and dozens of buildings in Kiryat Anavim and Beit Nekofa were destroyed or damaged in the blaze.

Beit Nekofa runs a bronze foundry that employs many Arabs from the surrounding villages.

Gallery

References

Moshavim
Populated places established in 1949
Populated places in Jerusalem District
Yugoslav-Jewish culture in Israel
1949 establishments in Israel